Demodocus can be:
 A character figuring in Homer's Odyssey, see Demodocus (Odyssey character)
 Demodocus (poet), a sixth century BC gnomic poet
 A dialogue ascribed to Plato, see Demodocus (dialogue)
 A swallowtail butterfly, Papilio demodocus